The Sharm El Sheikh Summit of 2005 was a meeting of four Middle Eastern leaders at Sharm El Sheikh, in the Sinai Peninsula, Egypt, that took place on 8 February in an effort to end the four-year Second Intifada which began in September 2000. The four leaders were Israeli Prime Minister Ariel Sharon, President of the Palestinian Authority Mahmoud Abbas, Egyptian President Hosni Mubarak, and King Abdullah II of Jordan.

Sharon and Abbas explicitly undertook to cease all violence against each other's peoples, marking a formal end to the Second Intifada, and reconfirmed their commitment to the Road map for peace process. Sharon also agreed to release 900 of the 7,500 Palestinian prisoners being held by Israel at the time, and to withdraw from West Bank towns.

Background
The Second Intifada, which began in September 2000, had by February 2005 led to over 5,000 Palestinian and Israeli casualties and took an extensive toll on both economies and societies. The cycle of violence persisted throughout this period, except for a short-lived Hudna in mid-2003.

Neither side was willing to negotiate until there was a halt to violence. Yasser Arafat, the man thought by many to have engineered the Intifada and to have kept it alive, died in November 2004. The Palestinian presidential election was held on 9 January 2005 to elect Arafat's successor. It confirmed Mahmoud Abbas as President of the Palestinian Authority. His initial efforts were to bring order to the anarchy in the Palestinian territories and halt attacks against Israel. As a good will gesture, Ariel Sharon changed his attitude towards negotiations and ordered a significant reduction of Israeli military activity in the Palestinian territories and took many measures to help Palestinian civilians.

These trust-building steps, together with renewed security coordination between the two sides and the backing of the United States, Jordan and Egypt led to the agreement to hold the Sharm El Sheikh Summit. The summit began with a series of meetings between Sharon and Mubarak, King Abdullah and Abbas. Later, all leaders except King Abdullah read statements reaffirming their commitment to continued efforts to stabilize the situation and reconfirmed their commitment to the Road map for peace process.

Outcome
Though no agreement was signed, Sharon and Abbas in their closing statements explicitly stated their intention for a cessation of all violent activity against each other's peoples, marking a formal end to the Second Intifada. They all reconfirmed their commitment to the Road map for peace process. Sharon also agreed to release 900 Palestinian prisoners and to withdraw from West Bank towns.

Subsequent events
The violence in Israel continued into the following years, though suicide bombings decreased significantly. By May 2005, 500 of the 900 prisoners scheduled for release had been released. However, after Qassam rocket attacks on Sderot on 5 May, Sharon stopped the release of the remaining 400 prisoners, saying the Palestinian Authority needs to rein in the militants.

See also

Arab–Israeli peace diplomacy and treaties
Paris Peace Conference, 1919
Faisal–Weizmann Agreement (1919)
1949 Armistice Agreements
Camp David Accords (1978)
Egypt–Israel peace treaty (1979)
Madrid Conference of 1991
Oslo Accords (1993)
Israel–Jordan peace treaty (1994)
Camp David 2000 Summit
Israeli–Palestinian peace process
Projects working for peace among Israelis and Arabs
List of Middle East peace proposals
International law and the Arab–Israeli conflict
Agreement on Movement and Access

References

External links
Full text of Abbas declaration
Full text of Sharon declaration

Israeli–Palestinian peace process
2005 in Israel
Diplomatic conferences in Egypt
21st-century diplomatic conferences (MENA)
2005 in international relations
2005 in the Palestinian territories
2005 conferences
Conferences in Sharm El Sheikh